John Andrew Beazley (May 25, 1918 – April 21, 1990) was a right-handed pitcher in Major League Baseball who played for the St. Louis Cardinals and Boston Braves.

As a rookie in 1942, Beazley went 21–6 with a 2.13 ERA for the Cardinals, as his 21 wins and ERA ranked him second in the National League behind teammate Mort Cooper (22 and 1.78). Beazley completed his feat pitching two complete-game wins in the team's World Series victory over the New York Yankees in five games, allowing three runs in Game Two and two runs in Game Five for a combined 2.50 ERA.

After the season, Beazley enlisted in the U.S. Air Force during World War II. While serving, he was sent to pitch for an Army team and felt pain in his arm, but ordered by his commanding officer to pitch through the pain, Beazley severely hurt his arm. Coming out of the service in 1946, he tried in vain to regain his form but was never the same, winning only nine games for the rest of his career.

In a six-season career, Beazley posted a 31–12 record with 147 strikeouts and a 3.01 ERA in 76 games, including three shutouts and 21 complete games in 374 innings pitched.

After leaving baseball, Beazley worked as a beer distributor. He died of cancer in Nashville at age 71.

References

External links

Baseball Library

1918 births
1990 deaths
Major League Baseball pitchers
Boston Braves players
St. Louis Cardinals players
New Orleans Pelicans (baseball) players
United States Army Air Forces personnel of World War II
Baseball players from Tennessee
People from Nashville, Tennessee
Leesburg Gondoliers players
Tallahassee Capitals players
Greenville Bucks players
Abbeville A's players
Montgomery Rebels players
Columbus Red Birds players
Mobile Shippers players
St. Petersburg Saints players
Nashville Vols players
Dallas Eagles players
Oklahoma City Indians players
Deaths from cancer in Tennessee
Lexington Giants (KITTY League) players